Eulophia meleagris is an orchid species in the genus Eulophia found in East Cape Province to KwaZulu-Natal in South Africa.

External links

meleagris